The 2013 Central American Games, the X edition of the Central American Games, were celebrated in San José, Costa Rica from 3 to 17 March 2013. It was largest multi-sport event organized in Costa Rica.

The games were officially opened by Costa Rican president Laura Chinchilla. Torch lighter was swimmer Sylvia Poll, who won the silver medal at the 1988 Olympic Games in Seoul.

Venues

San José, Costa Rica

Playa Herradura, Puntarenas
Open water swimming

Playa Hermosa, Guanacaste
Triathlon

Las Piedras, Guanacaste
Endurance riding (Equestrianism)

Sports 

 Aquatic sports
  Open water swimming
  Swimming
  Synchronized swimming
  Athletics
  Baseball
  Basketball
  Bodybuilding
  Bowling
  Boxing
  Chess
 Cycling
  BMX racing
  Mountain biking
  Road cycling
  Equestrian
  Fencing
 Football
  Football
  Futsal
 Beach soccer
  Gymnastics
  Handball
  Judo
  Karate
  Racquetball
  Roller speed skating
  Softball
  Table tennis
  Taekwondo
  Triathlon
 Volleyball
  Beach volleyball
  Volleyball
  Weightlifting
  Wrestling

Medal table

References

External links 
 Official Games Webpage (In Spanish)

 
Central American Games
International sports competitions hosted by Costa Rica
Central American Games
2013 in Central American sport
2013 in Costa Rican sport
Multi-sport events in Costa Rica